Amjad Ali may refer to:

 Amjad Ali (Fijian politician), Fiji Indian politician
 Amjad Ali (cricketer) (born 1979), United Arab Emirates cricketer
 Amjad Ali (civil servant) (1907–1997), Pakistani civil servant
 Amjad Ali (Pakistani politician) (born 1973), Pakistani politician
 Amjad Ali (Assam politician), Indian parliament member